The Sikorsky S-67 Blackhawk was a private-venture, prototype attack helicopter built in 1970 with Sikorsky Aircraft research and development (R&D) funds. A tandem, two-seat aircraft designed around the dynamic drive and rotor systems of the Sikorsky S-61, it was designed to serve as an attack helicopter or to transport up to eight troops into combat.

Design and development

AAFSS and S-66 bid
The United States Army issued a request for proposals (RFP) for its Advanced Aerial Fire Support System (AAFSS) program on 1 August 1964. Lockheed offered its CL-840 design, a rigid-rotor compound helicopter. Sikorsky submitted the S-66, which featured a "Rotorprop" serving as a tail rotor but as speeds increased would rotate 90° to act as pusher prop. The S-66 had short, fixed wings and was powered by a  Lycoming T55 turboshaft engine.

The U.S. Army awarded Lockheed and Sikorsky contracts for further study on 19 February 1965.  On 3 November 1965, the Army announced Lockheed as the winner of the AAFSS program selection. The Army perceived Lockheed's design as less expensive, able to be available earlier, and that it would have less technical risk than Sikorsky's Rotorprop.

S-67 development
Lockheed's design soon ran into development problems and cost and timelines began to grow. Sensing an opportunity, Sikorsky offered an armed SH-3 Sea King (Sikorsky S-61) version. After further AAFSS problems, the company developed an intermediate, high-speed attack aircraft named the Sikorsky S-67 Blackhawk in 1970.  Design work on the S-67 began in November 1969 with manufacturing following in February 1970.  The Blackhawk first flew on 20 August 1970.

The S-67 featured a five-bladed main rotor and tail rotor. The main rotor was taken from the S-61, but was modified to have a hub fairing, swept main rotor blade tips and a special "alpha-1" linkage which was added to the main rotor controls to increase collective pitch sensitivity and so extend the collective pitch range. The 20° swept main rotor blade tips help to overcome a phenomenon called sub-multiple oscillating track (SMOT) that causes variations in tip track at high Mach numbers. These allowed the S-67 to achieve and maintain high cruise speeds. To reduce drag at high speed, the main wheels retracted fully into the stub wing sponsons. It had speed brakes on the wing trailing edges that could be used to decrease speed or increase maneuverability.

The S-67 was fitted with a moving map display, a hands-on-collective radio tune control, and night vision systems. Its armament included a Tactical Armament Turret (TAT-140) with a three barrel  cannon, and could carry 16 TOW missiles,  rockets, or AIM-9 Sidewinder air-to-air missiles. The Blackhawk was powered by two General Electric T58-GE-5  engines.

Operational history

Evaluation and records
The S-67 Blackhawk, along with the Bell 309 KingCobra, was put through a series of flight test evaluations in 1972 by the U.S. Army. Neither aircraft was selected to replace the AH-56 Cheyenne. Instead, the Army chose to create the new Advanced Attack Helicopter program, which would lead to the AH-64 Apache several years later.

The S-67 performed a series of aerobatic maneuvers during its various marketing tours, including rolls, split-S, and loops. The S-67 was reputed to be very smooth and responsive, in spite of its size and speed.

These records stood for eight years.

As part of internal Sikorsky R&D efforts, in 1974, the S-67 had a  ducted fan fitted instead of its original conventional tail rotor. The S-67 with fan was tested over 29 flight hours to compare to the conventional tail. The original tail rotor and vertical tail fin were re-installed in August 1974.

Fatal crash and aftermath
The lone S-67 prototype crashed while conducting a low-level aerobatic demonstration at the Farnborough Airshow on 1 September 1974. The crew misjudged their pitch in a low-level roll maneuver causing the nose to drop below the horizon: they attempted to recover from their inverted position by performing a Split S maneuver, but they were too close to the ground. The aircraft struck the ground in a level attitude and immediately burst into flames. Sikorsky test pilot Stu Craig died on impact, and test pilot Kurt Cannon died nine days later from his injuries. Development work on the S-67 ceased after the accident.

The U.S. Army later assigned the name Black Hawk to the Sikorsky UH-60 Black Hawk helicopter.

Specifications (S-67 Blackhawk)

See also

References

Notes

Bibliography
 Derived from text at Historic U.S. Army Helicopters - Modern era helicopters
 Apostolo, Giorgio. The Illustrated Encyclopedia of Helicopters. New York: Bonanza Books. 1984. .
 Donald, David. "Sikorsky S-67, S-69 and S-72".The Complete Encyclopedia of World Aircraft. New York: Barnes & Noble Books, 1998. .
 Great Britain. Sikorsky S-67 Blackhawk N671SA: Report on the Accident at Farnborough, Hampshire, England on 1 September 1974. Aircraft accident report, 1/76. London: H.M.S.O., 1976. .
 Landis, Tony and Dennis R. Jenkins. Lockheed AH-56A Cheyenne. Warbird tech series, v. 27. North Branch, MN: Specialty Press Publishers and Wholesalers, 2000. .
 Yamakawa, George M., Albert L. Winn, Raymon B. Smith, Roy J. Anderson, Jr., and Warren E. Griffith, II. Attack Helicopter Evaluation, Blackhawk S-67 Helicopter. Ft. Belvoir: Defense Technical Information Center, July 1972. Retrieved on 22 December 2010.

External links

 Sikorsky S-67, First Blackhawk on helis.com

United States military helicopters
S-067
1970s United States attack aircraft
1970s United States helicopters
Twin-turbine helicopters
Aircraft first flown in 1970
Attack helicopters
Cancelled military aircraft projects of the United States